Edwin Owen (3 November 1910 – 2 April 2005) was an Anglican bishop in the Church of Ireland.

Owen was educated at The Royal School, Armagh and Trinity College, Dublin. He was ordained in 1935 and was a curate at both Glenageary and Christ Church, Leeson Park, Dublin. He was a minor canon of St Patrick’s Cathedral, Dublin and then chancellor’s vicar and finally succentor. From 1942 to 1957 he was the incumbent at Birr and then Dean of Killaloe Cathedral until 1972. He was elected as the Bishop of Killaloe and Clonfert on 1 December 1971 and was consecrated on 25 January 1972. In 1976, the sees of Killaloe and Clonfert were united to those of Limerick, Ardfert and Aghadoe, forming the current Diocese of Limerick and Killaloe, with Owen elected as Bishop of Limerick and Killaloe on 21 September 1976 and enthroned on 5 December 1976. He retired on 6 January 1981.

References

Bibliography

 
 

1910 births
2005 deaths
People educated at The Royal School, Armagh
Alumni of Trinity College Dublin
Deans of Killaloe
Bishops of Killaloe and Clonfert
Bishops of Limerick and Killaloe
20th-century Anglican bishops in Ireland